In knot theory, the stevedore knot is one of three prime knots with crossing number six, the others being the 62 knot and the 63 knot. The stevedore knot is listed as the 61 knot in the Alexander–Briggs notation, and it can also be described as a twist knot with four half twists, or as the (5,−1,−1) pretzel knot.

The mathematical stevedore knot is named after the common stevedore knot, which is often used as a stopper at the end of a rope.  The mathematical version of the knot can be obtained from the common version by joining together the two loose ends of the rope, forming a knotted loop.

The stevedore knot is invertible but not amphichiral.  Its Alexander polynomial is

its Conway polynomial is

and its Jones polynomial is

The Alexander polynomial and Conway polynomial are the same as those for the knot 946, but the Jones polynomials for these two knots are different.  Because the Alexander polynomial is not monic, the stevedore knot is not fibered.

The stevedore knot is a ribbon knot, and is therefore also a slice knot.

The stevedore knot is a hyperbolic knot, with its complement having a volume of approximately 3.16396.

See also
 Figure-eight knot (mathematics)

References

Double torus knots and links